Ryan Leigh Griffen (born 27 July 1986) is a former Australian rules footballer who played for the Western Bulldogs and the Greater Western Sydney Giants in the Australian Football League (AFL).

Griffen was born in Goolwa, a South Australian port town near the mouth of the Murray River and began his football career with South Adelaide. The Western Bulldogs chose Griffen in the 2004 AFL national draft at number 3 as a priority pick. He managed 17 games in his debut season and came second in the AFL Rising Star Medal count.

AFL career

Western Bulldogs (2005–2014) 
Touted among the best players on offer in the 2004 AFL draft, the Western Bulldogs selected Griffen third overall as a priority pick. He had represented South Australia in the 2004 AFL Under 18 Championships and played senior football for SANFL club South Adelaide in his draft year.

Griffen made his debut in Round 4 of the 2005 AFL season against the West Coast Eagles at Subiaco, where the Bulldogs were defeated by the Eagles by 36 points. He played 17 games in his first season as a Bulldog.

The 2006 Record describes Griffen as a "defender, both in a man-marking role and as a launching pad for attacking moves". Griffen has already displayed a good deal of the latter at the midway point of the 2006 season and most football critics anticipate that he will have a long career.

He suffered a jarring knee injury in Round 11 2007, where he dislocated his kneecap in the win over the Brisbane Lions. The extent of the injury, in itself, was not season threatening although he did suffer complications from a twisted bowel, which hampered his recovery and ruled him out for the rest of the season.

In 2008, Griffen played 24 games spending more time in the midfield, averaging career highs in disposals, contested and uncontested possessions, inside 50s and clearances. He covered plenty of territory and ranked number one at the Bulldogs in inside 50s and rebound 50s combined. He also ranked third in the AFL for running bounces and equal fourth at the Bulldogs for score assists during the H&A rounds. The speedy midfielder broke open a number of games in 2008, earning maximum Brownlow votes in consecutive matches against St Kilda and Essendon in rounds three and four. Finished second in the AFL for bounces and top 10 in the Bulldogs’ best and fairest.
In 2009, Griffen played well at times, winning three Brownlow Medal votes on multiple occasions, but many believe he hadn't reached his full potential.

Griffen was one of the players who spoke out regarding Jason Akermanis' controversial sacking midway through 2010 season. In the Round 14 match against Hawthorn, Griffen failed to make an effort to take a mark against Xavier Ellis 30 metres out late in the final quarter as the Hawks came from behind to win by 3 points, and he was widely criticized. Griffen made up for his mistake the following week when he was named among the Bulldogs' best in a 68-point thrashing of Carlton. On the eve of the finals, Griffen was shifted from his customary position on the wing into the midfield to replace injured teammate Adam Cooney. Although the Bulldogs were again bundled out in the Preliminary Final, Griffen was one of the stand-outs, averaging 28 possessions across the three games. At the end of the season he was proclaimed the winner of the 2010 Charlie Sutton Medal.

2011
In 2011 Ryan Griffen has maintained his excellent form from 2010 and is a frontrunner to win another Charlie Sutton Medal along with Matthew Boyd

2012
After another stellar season in 2012, Ryan Griffen amassed a club-record 47 possessions – 22 of which were contested in the round 21 match against the Sydney Swans. The record eclipsed the previous best of 46 set by Simon Atkins. Griffen picked up 16 touches in the first quarter. His previous best was 37 possessions.

2013: All-Australian season
Griffen produced possibly his best season in 2013, recording 30 or more possessions 11 times and taking out his second Charles Sutton Medal ahead of a fast-finishing Tom Liberatore. Griffen also finished 6th in the AFLPA MVP Award with 177 votes. While averaging 29 disposals per game he also achieved All-Australian honours. Ryan Griffen was also ranked #8 best player in the AFL in Mike Sheahan's Top 50 Players and the Official AFL Player Ratings. On 3 December 2013 Griffen was awarded the captaincy of the Bulldogs, taking over from skipper of 3 years Matthew Boyd.

Griffen played 19 games in his final season at the Bulldogs in 2014 before he left the club to join Greater Western Sydney, thus handing over the captaincy to veteran Robert Murphy.

Greater Western Sydney (2015–2018)
At the end of the 2014 season, Griffen asked to join the GWS Giants. On 15 October a trade was successfully reached, reuniting Griffen with coach Leon Cameron, and players Dylan Addison and Callan Ward.

In round 3, 2017 Griffen suffered a syndesmosis of the left ankle, which left him unable to play for the rest of the home and away season. He made his return in a scratch match between the Giants' reserves and 's reserves the day after their qualifying final.

Griffen announced his retirement from AFL football following the Giants' semi-final loss to Collingwood on 15 September 2018.

Post AFL 
In November 2018, it was announced that Griffen would be returning to his home club Goolwa-Port Elliot Magpies who compete in the Great Southern Football League.

Statistics

|- style="background:#eaeaea;"
! scope="row" style="text-align:center" | 2005
|  || 16 || 17 || 7 || 7 || 126 || 97 || 223 || 55 || 39 || 0.4 || 0.4 || 7.4 || 5.7 || 13.1 || 3.2 || 2.3
|-
! scope="row" style="text-align:center" | 2006
|  || 16 || 24 || 7 || 9 || 209 || 202 || 411 || 87 || 69 || 0.3 || 0.4 || 8.7 || 8.4 || 17.1 || 3.6 || 2.9
|- style="background:#eaeaea;"
! scope="row" style="text-align:center" | 2007
|  || 16 || 10 || 2 || 4 || 78 || 65 || 143 || 31 || 29 || 0.2 || 0.4 || 7.8 || 6.5 || 14.3 || 3.1 || 2.9
|-
! scope="row" style="text-align:center" | 2008
|  || 16 || 24 || 18 || 9 || 295 || 183 || 478 || 103 || 63 || 0.8 || 0.4 || 12.3 || 7.6 || 19.9 || 4.3 || 2.6
|- style="background:#eaeaea;"
! scope="row" style="text-align:center" | 2009
|  || 16 || 22 || 17 || 9 || 270 || 213 || 483 || 70 || 80 || 0.8 || 0.4 || 12.3 || 9.7 || 22.0 || 3.2 || 3.6
|-
! scope="row" style="text-align:center" | 2010
|  || 16 || 24 || 23 || 12 || 358 || 216 || 574 || 80 || 78 || 1.0 || 0.5 || 14.9 || 9.0 || 23.9 || 3.3 || 3.2
|- style="background:#eaeaea;"
! scope="row" style="text-align:center" | 2011
|  || 16 || 22 || 24 || 17 || 341 || 187 || 528 || 75 || 102 || 1.1 || 0.8 || 15.5 || 8.5 || 24.0 || 3.4 || 4.6
|-
! scope="row" style="text-align:center" | 2012
|  || 16 || 20 || 8 || 11 || 287 || 252 || 539 || 66 || 86 || 0.4 || 0.6 || 14.4 || 12.6 || 27.0 || 3.3 || 4.3
|- style="background:#eaeaea;"
! scope="row" style="text-align:center" | 2013
|  || 16 || 20 || 14 || 10 || 304 || 275 || 579 || 63 || 98 || 0.7 || 0.5 || 15.2 || 13.8 || 29.0 || 3.2 || 4.9
|-
! scope="row" style="text-align:center" | 2014
|  || 16 || 19 || 10 || 10 || 219 || 217 || 436 || 35 || 99 || 0.5 || 0.5 || 11.5 || 11.4 || 23.0 || 1.8 || 5.2
|- style="background:#eaeaea;"
! scope="row" style="text-align:center" | 2015
|  || 32 || 21 || 7 || 3 || 198 || 235 || 433 || 85 || 80 || 0.3 || 0.1 || 9.4 || 11.2 || 20.6 || 4.0 || 3.8
|-
! scope="row" style="text-align:center" | 2016
|  || 32 || 15 || 9 || 13 || 137 || 179 || 316 || 41 || 79 || 0.6 || 0.9 || 9.1 || 11.9 || 21.1 || 2.7 || 5.3
|- style="background:#eaeaea;"
! scope="row" style="text-align:center" | 2017
|  || 32 || 3 || 0 || 2 || 20 || 26 || 46 || 5 || 9 || 0.0 || 0.7 || 6.7 || 8.7 || 15.3 || 1.7 || 3.0
|-
! scope="row" style="text-align:center" | 2018
|  || 32 || 16 || 16 || 11 || 136 || 104 || 240 || 47 || 35 || 1.0 || 0.7 || 8.5 || 6.5 || 15.0 || 2.9 || 2.2
|- class="sortbottom"
! colspan=3| Career
! 257
! 162
! 127
! 2978
! 2451
! 5429
! 843
! 946
! 0.6
! 0.5
! 11.6
! 9.5
! 21.1
! 3.3
! 3.7
|}

References

 AFL Record 2006 Season Preview, ed.  Michael Lovett, AFL Publishing.

External links

Greater Western Sydney Giants players
Western Bulldogs players
1986 births
Living people
Australian rules footballers from South Australia
South Adelaide Football Club players
Charles Sutton Medal winners
All-Australians (AFL)
People from Goolwa, South Australia